The AJC Transatlantic Institute is the Brussels-based office of the American Jewish Committee, a global advocacy organization. It was founded in February 2004 to strengthen ties between Europe and the United States.

According to its mission statement, the AJC Transatlantic Institute works to promote "transatlantic cooperation for global security, Middle East peace and human rights." It is part of the American Jewish Committee's network of international offices, other notable ones including those in Berlin and Paris. In 2011, Daniel Schwammenthal was named Director of the AJC Transatlantic Institute. He was preceded by Dr. Emanuele Ottolenghi.

Director 
Before joining the AJC Transatlantic Institute in 2011, Daniel Schwammenthal worked for seven years as an editorial page writer and op-ed editor for The Wall Street Journal Europe in Brussels and Amsterdam, writing about EU politics and economics, the Arab-Israeli Conflict, Iran, Islamic extremism and terrorism. Prior to that, he worked for six years as a reporter for Dow Jones Newswires in Bonn, Berlin and Brussels covering German and European politics, economics and regulatory affairs.

International Advisory Council 
AJC Transatlantic Institute's International Advisory Council is chaired by former Spanish foreign minister Ana Palacio and includes former Democratic US-Congressman Robert Wexler, former Deputy Secretary of State John Negroponte and German journalist Josef Joffe.

References

External links
AJC Transatlantic Institute
Transatlantic Friends of Israel Inter-parliamentary Group

American Jewish Committee
International organisations based in Belgium